Vinod Raj (1937 – 31 December 2017) was an Indian actor, who worked on Tamil films. He is the father of Indian actor Vikram.

Career
Vinod Raj did not experience much personal success as an actor and often appeared in minor supporting roles in films and in television serials. He is best known for his appearance as Trisha's father in Ghilli (2004) and for his role alongside his son in Susi Ganesan's Kanthaswamy (2009).

Personal life
Vinod Raj was born as J. Albert Victor and was a native of Paramakudi, before running away from home to start a career in films. He was married to Rajeshwari, a sub-collector whose brother, Thyagarajan was an established director-actor in the Tamil film industry; with his son, actor Prashanth, being his nephew. Vinod's son Kennedy, who works with the stage name of Vikram, went from being a struggling actor to one of the leading actors in Tamil cinema after the release of Sethu (1999). Vikram is used as a screen name as he disliked his original name, Kennedy; the name Vikram was composed by taking "Vi" from his father's name, "K" from Kennedy, "Ra" from his mother's name and "ram" from his sun sign, Aries. Vikram's son, Dhruv, is also an actor, marking the third generation of actors in the family. Vinod's younger son, Arvind lives in Dubai, U.A.E. Vinod also has a daughter Anitha, who is a teacher.

Death
Vinod Raj died on 31 December 2017 following a heart attack at his home in Mahalingapuram, Chennai. He was laid to rest at Kilpauk cemetery.

Notable filmography 

Malaiyoor Mambattiyan (1983)
Kodi Parakkuthu (1988)
Ghilli (2004)
Thirupaachi (2005)
Thambi (2006)
Thiruttu Payale (2006)
Pachchak Kuthira (2006)
Manathodu Mazhaikalam (2006)
Maya Kannadi (2007)
Machakaaran (2007)
Kanthaswamy (2009)
Agam Puram (2010)
Aravaan (2012)

References

External links

Tamil male actors
Male actors in Tamil cinema
Indian Tamil people
Male actors from Tamil Nadu
20th-century Indian male actors
Indian male film actors
1930s births
2017 deaths
Year of birth uncertain